In chemistry, a stripping reaction is a chemical process, studied in a molecular beam, in which the reaction products are scattered forward with respect to the moving centre of mass of the system.

References

Chemical reactions